The men's decathlon competition at the 1998 European Athletics Championships in Budapest, Hungary, was held on 18 August and 19 August 1998. The event was one of the permit meetings of the inaugural 1998 IAAF World Combined Events Challenge.

Medalists

Schedule

18 August

19 August

Records

Results

See also
 1997 Men's World Championships Decathlon
 1998 Hypo-Meeting
 1998 Decathlon Year Ranking
 1999 World Championships in Athletics – Men's decathlon

References
 Decathlon2000
 Results

Decathlon
Combined events at the European Athletics Championships